Prosenactia is a genus of flies in the family Tachinidae.

Species
Prosenactia liebermanni Blanchard, 1940

Distribution
Argentina.

References

Diptera of South America
Endemic fauna of Argentina
Dexiinae
Tachinidae genera
Taxa named by Émile Blanchard
Monotypic Brachycera genera